The Odisha State Electricity Regulatory Commission or OERC is a Public Sector Undertaking of Government of Odisha established under the Orissa Electricity Reform (OER) Act, 1995, as a part of the Reform Process in the State of Odisha.

Divisions
The commission is organised to work through divisions namely Secretariat, Law, Engineering,
Tariff and Administration.

Subsidiaries
Western Electricity Supply Company of Odisha Limited (WESCO)
North Eastern Electricity Supply Company of Odisha Limited (NESCO)
Central Electricity Supply Utility of Odisha (CESU)
Southern Electricity Supply Company of Odisha Limited (SOUTHCO)

Locations
Balangir
Balasore (Baleshwar)
Berhampur (Brahmapur)
Cuttack
Dhenkanal
Khordha
Jeypore
Rourkela
Sambalpur

References

External links
Official Website of Odisha Electricity Regulatory Commission (OERC)

Economy of Odisha
State electricity agencies of India
State agencies of Odisha
Energy in Odisha
1995 establishments in Orissa
Government agencies established in 1995